Elizabeth Gunning may refer to:
Elizabeth Gunning (translator), niece of the baroness, translator and novelist
Elizabeth Campbell, 1st Baroness Hamilton of Hameldon, née Gunning, aunt of the writer

See also
Gunning (disambiguation)